Kozice Górne  is a village in the administrative district of Gmina Piaski, within Świdnik County, Lublin Voivodeship, in eastern Poland.

References

Villages in Świdnik County